The iPad Air (retrospectively referred to unofficially as the iPad Air 1 or original iPad Air) is a tablet designed, developed, and marketed by Apple Inc. It was announced on October 22, 2013, and was released on November 1, 2013. Part of the iPad line of tablet computers, the iPad Air features a thinner design than its predecessors, with similarities to the contemporaneous iPad Mini 2.
 
The iPad Air's successor, the iPad Air 2, was announced on October 16, 2014, and released on October 22, 2014, however, the 64GB and 128GB variants were discontinued, and later the 16GB and 32GB on March 21, 2016 after the announcement of the 9.7-inch iPad Pro, but the iPad Mini 2 continued in production until March 21, 2017 with the announcement of the 2017 iPad.

Features

Software
The iPad Air launched with version 7 of the iOS operating system. iOS 7 introduced a major aesthetic redesign of the operating system, departing from skeuomorphic elements such as green felt in Game Center, wood in Newsstand, and leather in Calendar, in favor of flat, colorful design. Jonathan Ive, the designer of iOS 7's new elements, described the update as "bringing order to complexity", highlighting features such as refined typography, new icons, translucency, layering, physics, and gyroscope-driven parallaxing as some of the major changes.

It can act as a hotspot with some carriers, sharing its Internet connection over Wi-Fi, Bluetooth, or USB, and also access the Apple App Store, a digital application distribution platform for iOS.

The iPad Air comes with several applications, including the Safari web browser, Mail, Photos, Video, Music, iTunes Store, App Store, Maps, Notes, Calendar, Game Center, Photo Booth, and Contacts. The iPad Air can optionally sync content and other data with a Mac or Windows computer using iTunes. Although the tablet is not designed to make phone calls over a cellular network, users can use a headset or the built-in speakers and microphone to place phone calls over Wi-Fi or cellular using a VoIP application, such as Skype. The device has a dictation application. This enables users to speak and the iPad types what they say on the screen. An Internet connection is required, as the speech is processed by Apple servers. Apple also began giving away its iLife (iPhoto, iMovie, Garageband) and iWork (Pages, Keynote, Numbers) apps with the device.

iOS 8 was released in 2014, alongside iPad Mini 3 and iPhone 6. IOS 8 introduced a variety of new features, including Continuity and Health (Apple)

iOS 9 was released in 2015. A major focus for the iPad was the introduction of three new multitasking features The Air supported two of these features, called Slide Over and Picture in Picture. Slide Over allows a user to "slide" a second app in from the side of the screen in a smaller window, and have it display information alongside the initial app. Picture in Picture allows a user to watch a video in a small, resizable, moveable window while remaining in another app. The third feature, dubbed Split View (which allows the user to run two apps simultaneously in a 50/50 view), was not supported by the device.

iOS 10 was released in 2016. IOS 10 brought new features, such as support for the AirPods.

iOS 11 was released in 2017.IOS 11 redesigned the control center, along with other new features.

In June 2019, Apple announced that it would drop support for the iPad Air with the release of iPadOS 13 in September 2019. The iPad Air is supported to iOS 12, with the latest 12.5.7 update released on January 23, 2023.

Design
The iPad Air marked the first major design change for the iPad since the iPad 2; it has a thinner design that is 7.5 millimeters thick and has a smaller screen bezel similar to the iPad Mini. Apple reduced the overall volume for the iPad Air by using thinner components resulting in a 22% reduction in weight over the iPad 2. It retains the same 9.7-inch screen as the previous iPad model. The new front-facing camera is capable of video in 720p HD, includes face detection, and backside illumination. The rear camera received an upgrade as well; now being called the iSight camera, in addition to the same functions as the front camera it also contains a 5MP CMOS, hybrid IR filter and a fixed ƒ/2.4 aperture.  The device was available in space gray and silver colors.

As with previous generations, Apple continued to use recyclable materials. The enclosure of the iPad Air was milled from a solid block of aluminum making it 100% recyclable. The iPad Air is also free of the harmful materials BFRs and PVC.

Hardware
The iPad Air inherits most of the same hardware components from the iPhone 5S, such as its Apple A7 system-on-chip and Apple M7 motion processor. The A7 present in the iPad Air is slightly different however, in that it does not use a PoP design which stacks the RAM on top of the SoC. It also features a metal heat spreader to compensate for the slightly faster clock speed and to provide better thermal management.  The Air also includes a 5 megapixel rear-facing camera (iSight), a FaceTime HD front-facing camera, support for 802.11n, and an estimated 10 hours of battery life. It boots faster than any previous iPad model.

As with all previous generations of iPhone and iPad hardware, there are four buttons and one switch on the iPad Air. With the device in its portrait orientation, these are: a "home" button on the face of the device under the display that returns the user to the home screen, a wake/sleep button on the top edge of the device, and two buttons on the upper right side of the device performing volume up/down functions, under which is a switch whose function varies according to device settings, functioning either to switch the device into or out of silent mode or to lock/unlock the orientation of the screen. It uses the same home button that was built in previous iPad models and therefore does not include a fingerprint scanner.

In addition, the WiFi only version weighs 469 grams while the cellular model weighs 478 grams – over 25% lighter than their respective predecessors. The display responds to other sensors: an ambient light sensor to adjust screen brightness and a 3-axis accelerometer to sense orientation and switch between portrait and landscape modes. Unlike the iPhone and iPod Touch's built-in applications, which work in three orientations (portrait, landscape-left and landscape-right), the iPad's built-in applications support screen rotation in all four orientations, including upside-down. Consequently, the device has no intrinsic "native" orientation; only the relative position of the home button changes.

The iPad Air was available with 16, 32, 64 or 128 GB of internal flash memory, with no expansion option. Apple also sells a "camera connection kit" with an SD card reader, but it can only be used to transfer photos and videos. As of the announcement of the iPad Pro 9.7-Inch on March 21, 2016, the iPad Air was discontinued.

All models can connect to a wireless LAN and offer dual band Wi-Fi support. The tablet is also manufactured either with or without the capability to communicate over a cellular network. The iPad Air (and the iPad Mini 2) cellular model comes in two variants, both of which support nano-SIMs, quad-band GSM, penta-band UMTS, and dual-band CDMA EV-DO Rev. A and B. Additionally, one variant also supports LTE bands 1–5, 7, 8, 13, 17–20, 25 and 26 while the other variant supports LTE bands 1–3, 5, 7, 8, 18-20 and TD-LTE bands 38, 39 and 40. Apple's ability to handle many different bands in one device allowed it to offer, for the first time, a single iPad variant which supports all the cellular bands and technologies deployed by all the major North American wireless providers at the time of the device's introduction.

The audio playback of the iPad Air is in stereo with two speakers located on either side of the Lightning connector.

Reception

Critical reception
The iPad Air received mainly positive reviews. Writing for AnandTech, Anand Lal Shimpi writes that the iPad Air "feels like a true successor to the iPad 4," praising it for its reduced weight and size. Shimpi further states that the Air "hits a balance of features, design and ergonomics that I don't think we've ever seen in the iPad." UK Editor-in-Chief of TechRadar, Patrick Goss, gave the iPad Air a positive review, giving praise to the A7 chip and camera upgrades, as well as the crisp and colorful display. He concludes by stating: "It's hard to put into words how much Apple has improved the iPad, offering a stunning level of detail and power with a build quality that's unrivalled." Christina Bonnington of Wired awarded the Air a rating of 8 out of 10, calling the performance "outstanding" and noting that high-definition video streams and gaming animations are "smooth and stutter free." She also praised the loading speeds of Safari, the web browser.

Bonnington criticized the speakers for being slightly muddled. Apple Inc. co-founder Steve Wozniak criticized the focus on decreasing size and weight rather than increasing storage space and stated that he did not want an iPad Air as it did not fit his personal needs. Dave Smith of the International Business Times wrote that while the device was nice, it did not bring anything new to the iPad. Smith strongly criticized the lack of a fingerprint reader, and noted that the updates, such as the increased speed and the decreased size and weight, were only slight improvements.

Commercial reception
The launch date for the iPad Air did not see as large of a turnout as usual for Apple products; however, this was expected by analysts due to the delayed release of the iPad Mini 2. The iPad Air sold out in Hong Kong just 2 hours after becoming available online.

Other models

Support

Models

Timeline

Explanatory notes

References

External links

 

Products introduced in 2013
Products and services discontinued in 2016
Air
iPad (5)
Tablet computers
Tablet computers introduced in 2013
Touchscreen portable media players